Ranoidea eschata is a species of tree frog in the subfamily Pelodryadinae. It is endemic to Papua New Guinea and has been observed on Rossel Island and Sudest Island, which are part of the Louisiade Archipelago.

References

Frogs of Australia
Amphibians described in 2009
Fauna of Papua New Guinea
eschata